Peshawar Electric Supply Company (PESCO).     (Urdu: مشارکتِ برائے ترسیلِ برق پشاور‎), is a public utility under the administrative control of the Federal Government of Pakistan, formerly a part of the Water & Power Development Authority’s Power Wing and headquartered in Peshawar. PESCO is responsible for the distribution of electricity to over 4.2 million consumers of all civil districts of Khyber Pukhtunkhwa, Pakistan.  PESCO maintains Khyber Pukhtunkhwa’s electricity distribution system via 132, 66, 33 kV sub-transmission lines, sub-stations and 11 kV & 440 V low tension lines with distribution transformers that deliver electricity to the general public and businesses.

History 
Water and Power Development Authority (WAPDA) was created in 1958 through WAPDA Act, 1958. Prior to this, the electricity supply service in Pakistan was undertaken by different agencies, both in public and private sectors, in different areas. The local areas electricity distribution service was being performed by various Regions of WAPDA. Then the Area Electricity Board (AEB) Peshawar, on the eight AEBs in Pakistan, was established under the scheme of Area Electricity Boards in 1982, in order to provide more autonomy and representation to provincial government, elected representatives, industrialists, agriculturalists, and other interest groups in functions of the AEBs. Peshawar Area Electricity Board was reorganized into one such corporatized entity under the name of Peshawar Electric Supply Company (PESCO) with effect from 22-03-1998 after the disbundling of the Water And Power Development Authority.

PESCO Jurisdictions
PESCO is divided into eight (06) Circles which are further divided into divisions and sub-divisions. PESCO covered area has been distributed as follows:

 Bannu circle.
 Khyber circle.
 Mardan circle.
 Peshawar circle.
 Swabi circle.
 Swat circle.
 Hazara-1 circle
 Hazara-2 circle

See also

 List of electric supply companies in Pakistan
List of Division offices of PESCO

References

Distribution companies of Pakistan
Economy of Peshawar
Energy companies established in 1998